Henry de Burgh, 1st Marquess of Clanricarde, KP, PC (Ire) (8 January 1742 – 8 December 1797), styled Lord Dunkellin until 1782 and The Earl of Clanricarde from 1782 until 1789, was an Irish peer and politician who was MP for Galway County (1768) and Governor and Custos Rotulorum of County Galway (1792–97).

Career

Henry was the son of John Smith de Burgh, 11th Earl of Clanricarde and from 1753 to 1758 was educated at Eton College. In 1768 he was a Member of Parliament in the Irish House of Commons representing Galway County. He succeeded his father as Earl of Clanricarde (among other titles) on 21 April 1782, and became a Knight of the Order of St Patrick on 5 February 1783, and on 6 March of the same year was invested as a member of the Privy Council of Ireland.

Family
On 17 March 1785, he married Lady Urania Anne Paulet, daughter of George Paulet, 12th Marquess of Winchester, but they had no children. He was made Marquess of Clanricarde on 17 August 1789. From 1792 until his death on 8 December 1797, he was Governor and Custos Rotulorum of County Galway.

Honours
KP: Knight of St. Patrick, 5 February 1783
PC (Ire): Privy Counsellor, 6 March 17838 December 1797

Arms

Ancestry

References

1742 births
1797 deaths
Irish MPs 1769–1776
Knights of St Patrick
Members of the Parliament of Ireland (pre-1801) for County Galway constituencies
Members of the Privy Council of Ireland
People educated at Eton College
Burgh, 1st Marquess of Clanricarde, Henry de
Henry
Members of the Irish House of Lords
Marquesses of Clanricarde